The Hamburg Wadden Sea National Park is the smallest of the three German Wadden Sea National Parks which protect the single ecological entity of the Wadden Sea reaching from Den Helder to Esbjerg.

It is an exclave of the city state of Hamburg in North Germany and lies 12.5 km off Cuxhaven in the estuary of the Elbe in the North Sea (German Bight) and includes the islands of Neuwerk, Scharhörn and Nigehörn. It is made up mainly of sand and mixed mudflats with shallow creeks, sand bars (Plaaten) and the dune islands. In 2011 the national park was added to the Wadden Sea World Heritage Site, highlighting its intact intertidal ecosystem, importance as a breeding area for many species of birds, and uniquely high biodiversity.

National park 
In accordance with a ruling by the Hamburg Parliament on 9 April 1990 the area was reclassified as the Hamburg Wadden Sea National Park. On 5 April 2001 the law was updated and the national park area expanded as a result.

The Zone 1 areas are under special protection, limiting mudflat hiking and horse and carriage rides to designated routes.

Within the national park there are about 2,000 animal species, of which about 250 are endemic to the salt marshes of the Wadden Sea. Of particular note are the common seal and the gray seal. Due to the natural influx of sediment, there is a high concentration of food for young fish and seabirds at the mouth of the Elbe. The national park is therefore an important resting and moulting area for seabirds.

For example, shelducks live on the snails that are found in hundreds of thousands on the surface of the mudflats. The approximately 180,000 birds of the north-western shelduck population spends also their moulting period from July to September in the Wadden Sea, which is protected by the three national parks in the states of Lower Saxony, Schleswig-Holstein and Hamburg. About 200,000 eider ducks also spend their moulting season here; about 1,000 pairs of eiders also use the mudflats of the North Sea as a breeding area. Most of them breed on the island of Amrum.

At the same time, the Wadden Sea is a resting place for breeding birds from northern climes that eat up the fat reserves they need for successful breeding. As a result, there are about 10-12 million waders, geese, ducks and gulls in the Wadden Sea as a whole.

The park works closely with the Jordsand Society (Verein Jordsand) especially in the area of bird conservation.

Biosphere reserve 
Since 1992 the national park has also been designated as a biosphere reserve, something which increases the importance of the park, because since then it has been placed under international protection in accordance with the UNESCO programme, "man and biosphere". The national park management is responsible for the care of the biosphere reserve and its national aspects.

Addresses 
 Nationalpark Hamburgisches Wattenmeer
 Nationalpark-Station Neuwerk, Turmwurt
 D - 27499 Insel Neuwerk
 Tel.: 04721 / 69271
and
Behörde für Umwelt, Klima, Energie und Agrarwirtschaft
Nationalpark-Verwaltung Hamburgisches Wattenmeer
Neuenfelder Straße 19
D - 21109 Hamburg

Sources

Filmography 
Im Nationalpark Wattenmeer. Documentary, 45 min., Deutschland, 1998, by Jens-Uwe Heins and Michael Sutor, Production: Komplett-Media-GmbH, Grünwald, Short description by ARD

See also 
Wadden Sea
Lower Saxony Wadden Sea National Park
Schleswig-Holstein Wadden Sea National Park
Wadden Sea Conservation Station
Mudflat hiking

References

External links 

 Hamburg Wadden Sea National Park 
 National park atlas

National parks of Germany
Biosphere reserves of Germany
Nature reserves in Hamburg
Wadden Sea
Protected areas of Hamburg
Protected areas established in 1990
1990 establishments in West Germany
Ramsar sites in Germany